Ernest Tilden Parker (1926–1991) was a professor emeritus of the University of Illinois at Urbana–Champaign. He is notable for his breakthrough work along with R. C. Bose and S. S. Shrikhande in their disproof of the famous conjecture made by Leonhard Euler dated 1782 that there do not exist two mutually orthogonal latin squares of order  for every . He was at that time employed in the UNIVAC division of Remington Rand, but he subsequently joined the mathematics faculty at t University of Illinois. In 1968, he and a Ph.D. student, K. B. Reid, disproved a conjecture on tournaments by Paul Erdős and Leo Moser.

Parker received his Ph.D. for work 'On Quadruply Transitive Groups' at Ohio State University in 1957; his advisor was Marshall Hall Jr.

Selected works
.
.

References

Ohio State University alumni
University of Illinois Urbana-Champaign faculty
20th-century American mathematicians
Latin squares
1991 deaths
1926 births
Combinatorialists